The Black Revolutionary War Patriots silver dollar is a commemorative dollar issued by the United States Mint in 1998.

See also

 List of United States commemorative coins and medals (1990s)
 United States commemorative coins

References

1998 establishments in the United States
Modern United States commemorative coins